Alma de sacrificio is a 1917 Mexican silent film by Azteca Estudios. It features Sara García in a very early appearance as an extra.

External links
 

1917 films
Mexican silent films
1917 romantic drama films
Mexican black-and-white films
Mexican romantic drama films
Silent romantic drama films